Typsiharpalus is a genus of beetles in the family Carabidae, containing the following species:

 Typsiharpalus azruensis Antoine, 1925
 Typsiharpalus bonvouloiri (Vuillefroy, 1866)
 Typsiharpalus punctatipennis (Rambur, 1838)

References

Harpalinae